An Unfinished Journey is a posthumous collection of essays by Shiva Naipaul, published by Hamish and Hamilton in 1986.

The foreword is written by the author's father-in-law, Douglas Stuart, who creates a short biographical sketch of the author, describing Shiva as a writer who gained in discipline but was painfully slow, even at times spending an entire afternoon trying to finish a sentence. He also asked Naipaul why he had lost the comic tone in his writing, and wrote that Naipaul attributed it to the arresting horror of witnessing the aftermath of the Jonestown Massacre, part of his research for the book Black & White.

The essays in the collection are in part autobiographical, such as those on Shiva's relationship with his brother VS Naipaul, and his experiences in Australia and other countries. The titular essay is the beginning of an unfinished (due to death) travel book about South East Asia. Also included is an essay called "The Illusion of the Third World", originally commissioned by Channel 4 Television.

References

1986 books
Essay collections